Dmitri Ivanovich Sautin (born 15 March 1974) is a Russian diver who has won more medals than any other Olympic diver. He was born in Voronezh.

Sautin started diving at age seven; however, his diving career almost ended in 1991 when he was stabbed multiple times in an attack. After spending two months in the hospital, he was able to dive at the 1992 Summer Olympics in Barcelona, Spain. He has won medals at the 1992, 1996, 2000, 2004, and the 2008 Olympics.

He is a deputy in the Voronezh Duma.

See also
List of multiple Summer Olympic medalists

References
 

1974 births
Living people
Russian male divers
Soviet male divers
Divers at the 1992 Summer Olympics
Divers at the 1996 Summer Olympics
Divers at the 2000 Summer Olympics
Divers at the 2004 Summer Olympics
Divers at the 2008 Summer Olympics
Olympic divers of the Unified Team
Olympic divers of Russia
Olympic gold medalists for Russia
Olympic silver medalists for Russia
Olympic bronze medalists for Russia
Olympic bronze medalists for the Unified Team
Sportspeople from Voronezh
Olympic medalists in diving
Medalists at the 2008 Summer Olympics
Russian sportsperson-politicians
Medalists at the 2004 Summer Olympics
Medalists at the 2000 Summer Olympics
Medalists at the 1996 Summer Olympics
Medalists at the 1992 Summer Olympics
World Aquatics Championships medalists in diving